PCH may refer to:

Places

 Pacific Coast Highway (California), segments of California State Route 1
 Palacios Airport (IATA code PCH) in Gracias a Dios Department, Honduras
 Parchim (district) (vehicle registration code: PCH), a former district in Germany
 Portcullis House, a parliamentary building in London

Organizations
 Packet Clearing House, an Internet infrastructure support organization
 PCH International, an Irish custom design manufacturing company
 Phoenix Children's Hospital, Phoenix, Arizona
 Perth Children's Hospital, Perth, Australia
 Publishers Clearing House, a direct marketing company

Science and technology
 .pch, a file extension for precompiled headers
 Paroxysmal cold hemoglobinuria, a human disease characterized by the sudden presence of hemoglobin in the urine
 Platform Controller Hub, an Intel chipset component
 Pontocerebellar hypoplasia, a group of neurodegenerative disorders
Phase-coherent holography, a type of holography

Music
"PCH", a song by Sublime with Rome from Yours Truly
"PCH", a song by Canadian rock band Theory of a Deadman from Wake Up Call (2017)
"PCH", a song by Tokyo Police Club from the EP Melon Collie and the Infinite Radness: Part One
”PCH”, a song by Jaden Smith and Willow Smith from the mix tape CTV2
"PCH", a song by ZZ Top from Antenna (1994)

Other uses
 PCH Games (formerly Candystand.com), a casual game portal owned by Publishers Clearing House
 Pacific Coast Hellway, a podcast from Los Angeles, US

See also
 USS High Point (PCH-1), a hydrofoil patrol craft